Inishdooey (Gaeilge: Inis Dúiche, although local Gaelic speakers know it as Oileán Dúiche, retaining the element ‘Inis’ only for the two nearby islands on either side of it) is a privately owned 96-acre island just off the north-west coast of County Donegal in Ulster, the northern province in Ireland. The island is situated 1 km north of Inishbofin, near Machaire Rabhartaigh (Magheroarty).

References

Islands of County Donegal
Uninhabited islands of Ireland